In Greek mythology, Saesara (Ancient Greek: Σαισάρᾳ) was an Eleusinian princess as the daughter of King Celeus and possibly Metaneira, and thus probably the sister of Callidice, Demo, Cleisidice, Callithoe, Diogeneia, Pammerope, Demophon, and Triptolemus. She married Crocon and became the mother of Meganeira, wife of Arcas, son of Zeus and Callisto.

Notes

References 

 Apollodorus, The Library with an English Translation by Sir James George Frazer, F.B.A., F.R.S. in 2 Volumes, Cambridge, MA, Harvard University Press; London, William Heinemann Ltd. 1921. ISBN 0-674-99135-4. Online version at the Perseus Digital Library. Greek text available from the same website.
 The Homeric Hymns and Homerica with an English Translation by Hugh G. Evelyn-White. Homeric Hymns. Cambridge, MA.,Harvard University Press; London, William Heinemann Ltd. 1914. Online version at the Perseus Digital Library. Greek text available from the same website.
 Pausanias, Description of Greece with an English Translation by W.H.S. Jones, Litt.D., and H.A. Ormerod, M.A., in 4 Volumes. Cambridge, MA, Harvard University Press; London, William Heinemann Ltd. 1918. . Online version at the Perseus Digital Library
 Pausanias, Graeciae Descriptio. 3 vols. Leipzig, Teubner. 1903. Greek text available at the Perseus Digital Library.

Princesses in Greek mythology
Eleusinian characters in Greek mythology